Not to be mistaken with the Salt Lake City Council Hall, a building of similar purpose and design.

The Council House, often called the State House, was the first public building in Utah; being constructed in 1849–50. The building stood in Salt Lake City, Utah Territory, on the corner of Main Street and South Temple Street. On June 21, 1883 the building was destroyed when a neighboring wagon depot caught fire and several barrels of gunpowder exploded, spreading the fire to the Council House.

History
The Council House was originally built to accommodate the government of the provisional State of Deseret. Deseret was never officially recognized by the United States Government, and so Utah Territory was organized by the U.S. Congress instead. Following the creation of the territory, it was decided to move Utah's capital city to Fillmore, Utah (because of its centralized location). In Fillmore, the territorial government began construction of the Utah Territorial Statehouse, yet the Council House continued to be used for official business until the statehouse was at least partially completed. During the first legislative session held in Fillmore, legislators complained about the lack of housing and adequate facilities in that city, so Salt Lake City was again designated Utah's capital. 

Once the capital returned to Salt Lake City, the Council House again was used as territorial offices and also housed several other entities such as the University of Utah, the Deseret News and Deseret Boarding House. The building was also used as a meeting place by the leadership of the Church of Jesus Christ of Latter-day Saints (LDS Church), and endowment sessions were held in the building until the completion of the Endowment House in 1855.

On June 21, 1883, the building was destroyed when a neighboring wagon depot caught fire and several barrels of gunpowder blew up. The explosion and resulting fire destroyed several other buildings, including the offices of photographer Charles Roscoe Savage, and caused damage to a number of nearby buildings, including ZCMI and the LDS Church tithing office. Today the Beneficial Tower (Gateway Tower West) sits on the Council House's former location.

See also

 Adam-ondi-Ahman
 Holy of Holies (LDS Church)
 List of historic sites of The Church of Jesus Christ of Latter-day Saints
 Red Brick Store
 Sacred Grove (Latter Day Saint movement)
 Temple (LDS Church)
 Temple president

References

External links
BYU Virtual Tours - The Council House

Utah Territory
Buildings and structures in Salt Lake City
Government buildings completed in 1850
Government buildings in Utah
Burned buildings and structures in the United States
1850 establishments in Utah Territory
Meetinghouses of the Church of Jesus Christ of Latter-day Saints in Utah